The Miss New Hampshire's Teen competition is the pageant that selects the representative for the U.S. state of New Hampshire in the Miss America's Outstanding Teen pageant. The pageant is held each February in Derry, New Hampshire.

Siena Lee Muccioli of Manchester was crowned Miss New Hampshire's Teen on February 19, 2023 at the Stockbridge Theater in Pinkerton Academy in Derry, New Hampshire. She is set to compete at Miss America’s Teen 2024.

In January of 2023, the official name of the pageant was changed from Miss New Hampshire’s Outstanding Teen, to Miss New Hampshire’s Teen.

Results summary
The year in parentheses indicates the year of the Miss America's Outstanding Teen competition the award/placement was garnered.

Placements
 Miss America's Outstanding Teens: Allie Nault (2016)
 Top 7: Morgane Vigroux (2019)
 Top 15: Lauren April (2011)

Awards

Preliminary awards
 Preliminary Evening Wear/On Stage Question: Allie Nault (2016)
 Preliminary Talent: Morgane Vigroux (2019)

Other awards
Overall Vocal Talent: Morgane Vigroux (2019)
 Teen in Action Award Winners: Allie Nault (2016)
 Teen in Action Award 2nd Runner-up: Corinne Kelly (2023)
 Teen in Action Award Finalists: Teghan Gregson (2017), Isabel Povey (2022)

Winners

Notes

References

External links
 Official website

New Hampshire
New Hampshire culture
Women in New Hampshire
Annual events in New Hampshire